Mady Kate Villiers (born 26 August 1998) is an English cricketer who plays for the England women's cricket team as an off break bowler. She also plays for Essex, Sunrisers and Oval Invincibles. In July 2019, she was named in England's squad for the Women's Twenty20 International (WT20I) fixtures of the 2019 Women's Ashes series, making her WT20I debut for England against Australia on 31 July 2019.

Early and personal life
Villiers was born on 26 August 1998 in Havering, Greater London. She attended Shenfield High School, winning several school-county cricket titles during her time there, and scored her first century off 65 balls, aged 14 in a Schools' Cup semi-final. Villiers is a vegan.

Domestic career
Villiers began playing age group cricket for Essex in 2012 before making her first-team debut in 2013, in a County Championship match against Yorkshire.  She did not bowl in the match, and made 1 run batting at number 11. She made her Twenty20 debut later that season, against Sussex, and went on to play four games in the 2013 Women's Twenty20 Cup.

2015 was a breakthrough season for Villiers, taking 8 wickets at 14.87 in the County Championship and 12 wickets at 6.66 in the Twenty20 Cup. She thereafter became a regular in Essex's side, and in 2018 was selected as part of the Surrey Stars squad for the 2018 Women's Cricket Super League. She played 11 matches in the season, taking 5 wickets at an average of 18.00. Her standout performance came in the final, when she took 3–22 to help her side win their first KSL. Villiers returned to play for the Stars the following season, where she took 5 wickets in 7 matches.

In 2020, Villiers joined the Sunrisers for the Rachael Heyhoe Flint Trophy. She played 2 games, picking up one wicket as well as scoring 64 against Southern Vipers. In 2021, she took five wickets in the Rachael Heyhoe Flint Trophy, as well as one in the Charlotte Edwards Cup. She also played for Oval Invincibles in The Hundred, scoring 51 runs and taking 6 wickets as the side won the competition. She played eleven matches for Sunrisers in 2022, across the Charlotte Edwards Cup and the Rachael Heyhoe Flint Trophy, and was the joint-second leading wicket-taker across the whole Rachael Heyhoe Flint Trophy, with 12 wickets at an average of 21.83. She also took six wickets for Oval Invincibles in The Hundred as the side won their second title.

International career
Villiers was named in her first England squad for the Women's Twenty20 International series against Australia in July 2019. She made her debut in the 3rd T20I, and took 2-20 from her four overs, dismissing Alyssa Healy and Ashleigh Gardner.

In November 2019, she was named in England's squad for their series against Pakistan. She played two T20Is, and took two wickets. Villiers went on to play one match in England's 2020 ICC Women's T20 World Cup campaign in Australia, taking 1–30 against the West Indies

On 18 June 2020, Villiers was named in a squad of 24 players to begin training ahead of international women's fixtures starting in England following the COVID-19 pandemic. She played all five matches in the subsequent series against West Indies, taking 2–10 in the 2nd T20I.

In 2021, Villiers was named in the squad for England's tour of New Zealand. She played all three T20Is on the tour, taking four wickets including an international career-best of 3/10 in the final match of the series. In June 2021, Villiers was named as in England's Test squad for their one-off match against India. In December 2021, Villiers was named in England's squad for their tour to Australia to contest the Women's Ashes. In February 2022, she was named as one of two reserve players in England's team for the 2022 Women's Cricket World Cup in New Zealand.

References

External links

1998 births
Living people
English women cricketers
England women Twenty20 International cricketers
Essex women cricketers
Surrey Stars cricketers
Sunrisers women's cricketers
Oval Invincibles cricketers